Chetram (born 10 July 1951) is an Indian politician and a member of 17th Legislative Assembly of Powayan, Uttar Pradesh of India. He represents the Powayan constituency of Uttar Pradesh and is a member of the Bharatiya Janata Party.

Political career
Chetram has been a member of the 17th Legislative Assembly of Uttar Pradesh. Since 2017, he has represented the Powayan constituency and is a member of the BJP.

Posts held

See also
Uttar Pradesh Legislative Assembly

References

Uttar Pradesh MLAs 2017–2022
Bharatiya Janata Party politicians from Uttar Pradesh
Living people
1951 births
Uttar Pradesh MLAs 2022–2027